The Parecis plateau is a plateau in the Brazilian state of Rondônia and adjacent west-central Mato Grosso. The municipality of Parecis is located at the plateau. Several large rivers have their origin on the plateau, notably the Guaporé, Ji-Paraná, Juruena and Paraguay River. The Mato Grosso Plateau is directly to the east of Parecis.

References

 Encyclopædia Britannica: Parecis Mountains. Retrieved 20 February 2013.

External links 
Portal Amazônia (In Portuguese)

Plateaus of Brazil
Landforms of Rondônia
Landforms of Mato Grosso